Fernando Atzori (1 June 1942 – 9 November 2020) was an Italian flyweight boxer who won a gold medal at the 1964 Olympics. In the final, he defeated Artur Olech of Poland, despite suffering an eye injury. After the Olympics, he turned professional and won the European title in 1967. Atzori defended it nine times before losing it in 1972. He then regained it and lost again in 1973. Atzori retired from the ring in 1975.

1964 Olympic results
Below are the results of Fernando Atzori, who competed for Italy as a flyweight boxer at the 1964 Olympics in Tokyo.

 Round of 32: bye
 Round of 16: defeated Darryl Norwood (Australia) on points, 5-0
 Quarterfinal: defeated John McCafferty (Ireland) on points, 5-0
 Semifinal: defeated Robert Carmody (USA) on points, 4-1
 Final: defeated Artur Olech (Poland) on points, 4-1 (won gold medal)

References

External links
 
 
 

1942 births
2020 deaths
People from the Province of Oristano
Flyweight boxers
Olympic gold medalists for Italy
Boxers at the 1964 Summer Olympics
Olympic boxers of Italy
Olympic medalists in boxing
Italian male boxers
Sportspeople from Sardinia
Medalists at the 1964 Summer Olympics
European Boxing Union champions
Mediterranean Games medalists in boxing
Mediterranean Games gold medalists for Italy